Abdou-Lakhad Diallo (born 4 May 1996), known as Abdou Diallo, is a professional footballer who plays as a centre-back for Bundesliga club RB Leipzig, on loan from Ligue 1 club Paris Saint-Germain. Born in France, he plays for the Senegal national team.

Club career

Monaco
Born in Tours, Diallo joined the youth academy of Monaco at the age of 15. On 28 March 2014, he signed his first professional contract with the club. Vice-president of the club, Vadim Vasilyev commented that Diallo "fits perfectly into our sports project. He has a lot of talent and we hope that he will continue to progress alongside the great players of AS Monaco". On 14 December, he made his first team debut, coming on as a substitute for Bernardo Silva in the extra time of a 1–0 league victory against Marseille.

In June 2015, Diallo was loaned out to Belgian club Zulte Waregem for the 2015–16 season. During his stint at the club, he was deployed at an attacking role, scoring three goals in 33 league matches. In December 2016, media reports emerged that Spanish club Real Betis was interested in signing him. Nevertheless, he made five league appearances during the 2016–17 season, with his side winning the league.

Mainz 05
On 14 July 2017, Diallo moved to Bundesliga club Mainz 05, and signed a five-year contract. On 9 September, he scored his first goal for the club in a 3–1 league victory against Bayer Leverkusen. During the season, he was deployed at both back three and back four; and had an 80% pass success rate. He started in 27 league matches during the season.

Borussia Dortmund
On 26 June 2018, Diallo joined Borussia Dortmund on a five-year deal for a fee of €28 million. In an interview, he said that Ousmane Dembélé advised him to join the club. On 15 September, he scored his first goal for the club in a 3–1 league victory against Eintracht Frankfurt.

Paris Saint-Germain
On 16 July 2019, Diallo signed for Paris Saint-Germain (PSG) until June 2024. The transfer fee of his deal to the French club was of €32 million.

On 3 August 2019, Diallo made his debut for Paris Saint-Germain in the Trophée des Champions, which ended as a 2–1 win for PSG over Rennes. He made his league debut against Nîmes, in a 3–0 home win on 11 August. Diallo's UEFA Champions League debut came on 18 September, in a 3–0 win against Real Madrid. At the end of the 2019–20 season, Diallo received a Ligue 1 winners medal for his contributions that season, which was ended early (on 30 April 2020) due to the COVID-19 pandemic.

Loan to RB Leipzig 
On 1 September 2022, Diallo completed a return to Germany, signing for Bundesliga club RB Leipzig on a season-long loan with an option-to-buy for a reported fee of €25 million.

International career
Diallo was born in France and is of Senegalese descent. He played for many youth teams of France, and even captained France's under-21s.

On 17 March 2021, Diallo was called up to the Senegal national team for the first time. He made his debut in a 0–0 draw against Congo on 26 March.

Style of play
Diallo plays as a central defender. Rouven Schröder (sporting director of 1. FSV Mainz) has said that Diallo is "strong in the air and shrewd in the challenge". Michael Zorc, the sporting director of Borussia Dortmund, described Diallo as "a modern, strong central defender who is very intelligent. He can play a wider defensive role too or even be deployed in a defensive midfield role".

Personal life
Diallo's younger brother, Ibrahima, is also a footballer for Southampton.

Career statistics

Club

International

Scores and results list Senegal's goal tally first. Score column indicates score after each Diallo goal.

Honours
Monaco
Ligue 1: 2016–17 

Paris Saint-Germain
Ligue 1: 2019–20, 2021–22
Coupe de France: 2019–20, 2020–21
Coupe de la Ligue: 2019–20
Trophée des Champions: 2019, 2020, 2022
UEFA Champions League runner-up: 2019–20

Senegal
 Africa Cup of Nations: 2021

References

External links

 
 
 
 

1996 births
Living people
Sportspeople from Tours, France
Citizens of Senegal through descent
Senegalese footballers
Senegal international footballers
French footballers
France under-21 international footballers
France youth international footballers
French sportspeople of Senegalese descent
Association football central defenders
Ligue 1 players
Belgian Pro League players
Bundesliga players
S.V. Zulte Waregem players
AS Monaco FC players
1. FSV Mainz 05 players
Borussia Dortmund players
Paris Saint-Germain F.C. players
RB Leipzig players
2021 Africa Cup of Nations players
2022 FIFA World Cup players
Africa Cup of Nations-winning players
French expatriate footballers
French expatriate sportspeople in Belgium
Expatriate footballers in Belgium
French expatriate sportspeople in Germany
Expatriate footballers in Germany
Black French sportspeople
Footballers from Centre-Val de Loire